Martim da Maia (1350–1434) was a Portuguese nobleman, 1st Lord of Trofa in the Kingdom of Portugal.

Biography 

His wife was Ana de Lançós, daughter of Florença de Lançós and Richarte de Teive, a French nobleman, descendant of John, King of England).  

Martim da Maia was a direct descendant of Trastamiro Aboazar (Portuguese nobleman), 1st Lord of Maia. And of Egas Moniz belonging to the Court of Afonso I of Portugal.

References 

1350 births
1434 deaths
14th-century Portuguese people
15th-century Portuguese people
Portuguese nobility
Portuguese Roman Catholics